Marius Nygaard may refer to:

 Marius Nygaard (academic) (1838–1912), Norwegian educator and linguist
 Marius Nygaard (judge) (1902–1978), Norwegian judge

See also